Willem Vermandere (born February 9, 1940 in Lauwe, Belgium) is a Belgian singer, Flemish cabaret artist, writer, sculptor, guitarist and painter. His songs are written and sung in the dialect of the South of West-Flanders in Belgium. His most famous songs are ‘Klein ventje van Elverdinge’, ‘Lat mie maar lopen’, ‘Als ik zing’, ‘Blanche en zijn peird’, ‘Bange blankeman’, ‘Duizend soldaten’, ‘La Belle Rosselle’ and ‘Ik plantte ne keer patatten’.

Biography

Vermandere studied Religion at Ghent and has been a teacher at Nieuwpoort. Although he is most known for his music, Vermandere is more active as a sculptor. His repertoire expresses criticism on society. His performances are a mixture of seriousness, sadness and fun. His songs can be considered poetry.

He performs as a band with Freddy Desmedt and Pol Depoorter. In 1993 Vermandere wrote the song "Bange Blanke Man" ("Frightened White Man"), a song criticizing racism and xenophobia in a multicultural society. When performing at the Grand-Place in Brussels in 1992 Vermandere was physically assaulted by members of the far-right party Vlaams Blok. He also received letters of threat.

In 2000 he was bestowed with the title of honorary citizen of Veurne, where he currently lives in the suburb of Steenkerke. In 2009 the Flemish ‘Radio 2’ station nominated him as a member of the galley of honor for a life filled with music.

Discography 
 Liedjes Van De Westhoek, 1968
 Langs De Schreve, 1969
 Willem Vermandere (album),1971
 Vier (album), 1973
 Met Mijn Simpel Lied, 1976
 Lat Mie Maar Lopen, 1981
 Als ik zing', 1984
 Willem Vermandere, 1988
 Ik wil maar zeggen, 1988
 De eerste jaren, 1989
 Lat mie maar lopen, 1991
 Een avond in Brussel, 1990
 Help mij, 1993
 Mijn Vlaanderland, 1995
 De vergeten liedjes, 1996
 In de donkerste dagen, 1997
 Onderweg, 1999
 Gezongen uit de ark, 2000
 De eerste jaren II, 2000
 Van Blanche tot Blankeman, 2000
 Omzwervingen - Liedjes zonder woorden, 2002
 Op den duur, 2003
 Master serie - Willem Vermandere, Het beste van, 2005
 Van soorten, 2005
 Altijd iemands vader, altijd iemands kind, 2006
 Alles gaat over, 2010
 De zanger & de muzikant Vincent Troch', 2012
 Den overkant & de meditaties, 2014
 14-18 En wat nu?, 2015
 Confessies, 2020

Books 
 Thuis en nog veel verder, 2000, Gent, Blobe, 224 pp.
 Van Blanche tot Blankeman, 2007, Lannoo: 122 liedjesteksten
 De zeven laatste woorden, 2013, Lannoo, 70 p.

Art

The sculpture Verzoening, in English Reconciliation, was created by Willem Vermandere to commemorate World War I. It was erected October 8, 2014 at the geographical starting point of the Western Front.

References

External links 
 

20th-century Belgian male singers
20th-century Belgian singers
Belgian folk singers
Belgian male guitarists
Belgian clarinetists
Belgian painters
Belgian sculptors
Album-cover and concert-poster artists
1940 births
Living people
Dutch-language singers of Belgium
21st-century Belgian male singers
21st-century Belgian singers
21st-century clarinetists